Terry Sheehan  (born 1970) is a Canadian politician presently serves as the Member of Parliament for Sault Ste. Marie in the House of Commons of Canada, first elected in the 2015 federal election. He was re-elected in the 2019 federal election. Prior to his parliamentary service, Sheehan served on the Sault Ste. Marie City Council from 2003 to 2015, representing Ward 2, after two terms as a Trustee on the Huron-Superior Catholic District School Board.

In the 42nd Parliament, Sheehan was a member of the International Trade Committee and the Industry, Science, and Technology Committee, in addition to serving as co-chair of the Canada-Japan Interparliamentary Group, Chair of the Northern Ontario Liberal Caucus, member of the All-Party Steel Caucus and a member of the Executive Committees of the Canada-Ireland and Canada-Italy Interparliamentary Groups.

In the 43rd Parliament, Sheehan was named Parliamentary Secretary to the Minister of Economic Development and Official Languages, with responsibility for the Federal Economic Development Initiative for Northern Ontario.

Sheehan was re-elected to the 44th Parliament of Canada in the 2021 federal election.

Electoral record

Federal

References

External links

1970 births
Living people
Canadian management consultants
Lake Superior State University alumni
Liberal Party of Canada MPs
Members of the House of Commons of Canada from Ontario
Ontario school board trustees
Sault Ste. Marie, Ontario city councillors
21st-century Canadian politicians